Annette Daniels (September 10, 1961 – April 1, 2004) was an American mezzo-soprano opera singer.

Career
Daniels appeared with a variety of opera companies in the United States including Houston, Washington, D.C., Dallas, San Diego, Cincinnati, and Portland.  She also performed numerous oratorios as well as concert works with orchestras.  One of her notable roles was Betty in the first production of Monticello.  A recording of the performance was broadcast on National Public Radio and released on an audio CD.

Personal life
Daniels was born and raised in Wichita, Kansas.  She graduated from Wichita State University with a B.A. in Voice Performance and French and a Masters of Fine Arts from The University of Michigan in 1985.   Daniels died of cancer at age 42 in Houston in 2004.

External links
Master Performances Company - Profile of Annette Daniels
Jefferson-Hemings Opera Monticello Sings in L.A  (April 26, 2000) - Article by Playbill about the opera Monticello.
Review of The Barber's New Clothes in The Houston Press - Annette Daniels was in the cast of the opera reviewed, although the review doesn't focus on her.

1961 births
2004 deaths
Musicians from Wichita, Kansas
American operatic mezzo-sopranos
Deaths from cancer in Texas
Wichita State University alumni
University of Michigan alumni
Singers from Kansas
20th-century American women opera singers
21st-century American women